The Rankin Family is the debut album by Canadian folk music group The Rankin Family. The album was originally self-released by the siblings in 1989. It was re-issued by Capitol Records in 1992 and certified Platinum by the CRIA.

Track listing
"Mo rùn geal dìleas (My Faithful Fair One)"
"Lonely Island"
"Loving Arms"
"Piano Medley: Memories of Bishop MacDonald/The Tweeddale Club/MacFarlane's Rant/Lively Steps"
"Mairi's Wedding (Michael Rankin's Reel)"
"Roving Gypsy Boy"
"Chì mi na mòrbheanna (Mist Covered Mountains)"
"Fiddle Medley: The Warlock's Strathspey/Bog-an-Lochan/Nine Pint Coggie/Mr. J. Forbes/Hull's Reel"
"Lament of the Irish Immigrant"
"Jigging Medley: Whiskey in a Cup/King George/Old King's Reel/King's Reel/Bodachan a'mhìrein"

References

External links
[ The Rankin Family] at Allmusic

1989 debut albums
The Rankin Family albums
Capitol Records albums